The South Wales Warriors are a British American Football team based in Llanharan, Mid Glamorgan, Wales. They play in SFC 1 West for the 2022 season. The team was formed in 2001 after the Tiger Bay Warriors had disbanded due to the departure of head coach Rob Mota, along with key staff and players, by the remaining players and staff; the staff used equipment, resources and shirts from the folded Tiger Bay Warriors for economical purposes.

They play their home games at the home of Llanharan rugby club. In the 2008 season the South Wales Warriors won their conference with a record of 9 wins and 1 loss before losing their playoff quarter-final to the Cambridgeshire Cats. However, they were promoted following the reorganisation of the BAFL for the 2009 season. They were relegated to Division 2 West during the 2010 BAFA Community League restructure.

In 2011, the Warriors finished the regular season as runners up in the Division 2 West and finished fifth seed in Division 2 enabling them to enter the playoffs, eventually winning promotion and Division 2 Championship on 25 September at the Britbowl Championships held at the Crystal Palace National Sports Centre.

In 2012, the Warriors finished the Season with a record of 6 wins and 4 losses leaving them out of the playoffs and 4th in the Division 1 South and Central Division.

After being promoted to the BAFANL Premier South during the 2012/2013 league restructure, they played various teams from the southern half of the UK and primarily the 3 major London teams, London Warriors, London Blitz and London Olympians. After the end of the 2013 season, the club suffered heavily from the loss of key players to their Permier South rivals Bristol Aztecs across the border in England. This included Britball MVP Quarterback Gareth Thomas and wide receiver Benny Sherwood. The Warriors played through the following 3 seasons in the Premier South, culminating in their best Premier South record of 3 wins, 1 tie and 5 losses in 2016.

For the 2017 season, BAFA and the Warriors had taken the mutual decision to be demoted to the SFC 1 Central division after retirements and injuries to several veteran Warriors. For this they are unable to progress to the Post Season finals of SFC 1 Central for the 2017 and 2018 Season, and therefore be promoted to the Premier South division.

History

South Wales Warriors (2001 to 2010)

In 2001, the team was formed as the South Wales Warriors and were admitted into the British Senior League to compete in Division Two South. After a year out of action, they found the going tougher and finished with a 2-5-1 record. The following two seasons repeated this pattern, with the Warriors finishing with  3-6 and 5-5 records in 2002 and 2003 respectively. However, 2004 saw a vast improvement and they finished second in their group with a 7-2-1 record, making the playoffs for the first time since reforming. Unfortunately, they were knocked out at the first stage, losing their quarter-final 6–30 to the Chiltern Cheetahs.

This feat was repeated in 2005, finishing the regular season in second place before losing their playoff quarter-final. In 2006, the Warriors once again finished in second place, clinching their spot on the last match day of the regular season with a 27–21 win away to the Andover Thrashers. They were drawn at home to the Essex Spartans for their wildcard playoff. The Warriors posted an impressive win, however, the visitors complained to the BAFL that the pitch at Bedwas RFC was too short, and therefore did not comply with league rules. After consultations between the two teams, the game was played as normal but the BAFL decided afterwards that the Warriors would forfeit the game, and therefore the game was awarded to the Spartans as a 1–0 victory.

The 2007 season saw the Warriors get over their play-off disappointment by winning their group with a near-perfect 9–1 record to win their second ever conference championship. A 13–7 quarter-final win against the Cambridgeshire Cats set up a semi-final tie away to the Norwich Devils, who came into this game on the back of a perfect 10-0 regular season and a quarter-final win against the Cornish Sharks. Unfortunately for the Warriors they were unable to beat an impressive home team, going down 28–43.

South Wales Warriors (2011)
The 2011 Season saw the Warriors compete in the reformed BAFA National Leagues. The opening game of the season saw them take on the Gloucester Banshees and win 46–0, one of four shut out games that season, which were to set the tone of the Warriors season. Eight wins and two defeats to the hands of the Berkshire Renegades resulted in the team finishing runners up in the Division 2 West league and entering the playoffs as wild card fifth seed. The quarter finals against the Kent Exiles resulted with a 33-13 Warriors victory . The Warriors then moved on to the semi finals at the home ground of the Lancashire Wolverines in Blackburn. The Wolverines were soundly beaten 32–17, leading to a South Wales Warriors and West Coast Trojans Britbowl final at Crystal Palace and promotions to Division 1 for both teams. The Division 2 Britbowl final was played on 25 September 2011 at the Crystal Palace Stadium, London, with the final result of 48–20 to the Warriors crowning them Britbowl XXV BAFANL Division 2 Champions.

South Wales Warriors (2012)
2012 saw the newly promoted Warriors to Division 1 South and Central play a condensed season of football (10 Games over 13 weeks). The warriors had a mixed result to the season, winning six games and losing four. The Warriors home game to Essex Spartans was postponed from 16 June to 15 July due to adverse weather conditions affecting large parts of mainland Britain at the time, the subsequent game was forfeited after Essex were unable to field a team. The Warriors managed to keep a 100% home record for the season which left them finishing in fourth place within the division.

On 23 September it was announced that the South Wales Warriors were to be promoted to the Premiership South Division after an expansion programme run by BAFA.

South Wales Warriors (2013)
2013 saw the newly promoted Warriors in the expanded Premiership South Conference and played a season of 10 games from end of April till the end of August. The Warriors played each club in the Conference once give a total of 5 away games and 5 home games. The Warriors started the season at home to Peterborough Saxons, which ended in a narrow loss and ended the season on the road to London Olympians, which again was a narrow loss. The Warriors finished 9th in the division and started to get ready for their second season in the Premiership South Conference.

South Wales Warriors (2014)
2014 saw the Warriors again in the Premiership South Conference and played a season of 8 games from end of April till the end of August (8 as Sussex Thunder pulled out before the season began.) The Warriors played each club in the Conference once - a total of 4 away games and 4 home games. The Warriors started the season at home to Colchester Gladiators, which ended in a victory and ended the season at home to the London Olympians, which was a narrow loss. The Warriors finished 6th in the division with a 3–5 record, with victories in the home games against Colchester Gladiators, East Kent Mavericks and Cambridgeshire Cats, and defeats against Bristol Aztecs, London Blitz, London Warriors, London Olympians and Berkshire Renegades.

Senior team season records

Summary

2011 Results

2012 Results

2013 Results

2014 Results

2015 Results

2016 Results

2017 Results

2018 Results

2019 Results

2021 Results

2022 Results

2023 Results

Game Venue and Training
The home of the South Wales Warriors from 2009 has been the Dairy Field, home of Llanharan RFC, which is situated around half an hour north west of Cardiff. The ground was purchased by the rugby club in 1989. A 440-seat stand was built shortly afterwards, with a bank of covered terracing built on the opposite side two years later and a new clubhouse was built in 2002 on the site of the local British Legion Club. It is one of only three American football venues in the United Kingdom to use a referee's microphone. The team also use Roath Park Recreational Ground for informal training sessions.

For the 2008 season, the Warriors played their home games at Sully Sports & Leisure Centre, located in the village of Sully, just outside Barry. They shared this ground with a number of local sports teams including Sully rugby club and a baseball club. For the 2006 and 2007 seasons, the Warriors played their home matches at the Bridge Field, located in Bedwas, Caerphilly, which they shared with Bedwas rugby club.

Before this, the team were based in Cardiff with most of their games played at Canton rugby club, and a few games also being played at Llanrumney Leisure Centre and Roath Park Recreational Ground.
While Llanharan RFC play on the Dairyfield toward the end of the UK Rugby season, the Warriors train on 3G Astroturf at Y Pant Comprehensive School, Pontyclun during winter months and the Llanharan Welfare Ground during the Spring Months.

Roster 2022

References

External links
South Wales Warriors Official Web Site
South Wales Warriors Official Twitter Account
South Wales Warriors Facebook Fan Page

BAFA National League teams
American football teams in Wales
2001 establishments in Wales
American football teams established in 2001